Joscho Stephan (born 23 June 1979 in Mönchengladbach, West Germany) is a German jazz guitarist who plays mainly modern Gypsy jazz influenced by Django Reinhardt. He began playing the guitar at the age of six, influenced by his father who had been a member of a cover band.

Discography 
 "Swinging Strings"  (Acoustic Music Records, 1999)
 Swing News (Acoustic Music Records, 2001)
 Django Forever (Acoustic Music, 2003)
 Acoustic Live (Acoustic Music, 2006)
 Django Nuevo (Acoustic Music, 2009)
 Live at Satyrblues Fest. 2009 (Tarnobrzeskie Stowarzyszenie Oko, 2010)
 Gypsy Meets the Klezmer (MGL, 2012)
 Joscho Stephan's Acoustic Rhythm (MGL, 2013)
 Joscho Stephan Trio (MGL, 2014)
 Guitar Heroes with Tommy Emmanuel, Stochelo Rosenberg and Biréli Lagrène (MGL, 2015)
 Paris-Berlin (Berliner Meister Schallplatten, 2018)
 Salon 18 (MGL, 2019)
 Transatlantic Guitar Trio with Richard Smith and Rory Hoffman (MGL, 2020)
 Sundowner with Peter Autschbach (Timezone, 2021)

References

External links 

 
 Album review
 Interview (in German)

German jazz guitarists
German male guitarists
Gypsy jazz guitarists
People from Mönchengladbach
1979 births
Living people
21st-century guitarists
21st-century German male musicians
German male jazz musicians